Wren is an unincorporated community in Benton County, Oregon, United States. It is located at the junction of U.S. Route 20 and Oregon Route 223 on the Marys River.

Wren was named for George P. Wren, who settled in the area. The first form of the name was "Wrens", used for a station established by the Oregon Pacific Railroad in the locality in 1886. Wren had a post office from 1887 to 1968.

See also
Harris Bridge (Wren, Oregon)

References

External links

Historic photos of Wren from Salem Public Library

1886 establishments in Oregon
Populated places established in 1886
Unincorporated communities in Benton County, Oregon
Unincorporated communities in Oregon